Harry Hart may refer to:

People
Harry Hart (athlete) (1905–1979), South African discus thrower and shot putter
Harry Hart (footballer) (1926–2012), English footballer 
Harry Hart (basketball), player for Omonia B.C.
Harry Hart (mathematician), inventor ~1874 of Hart's inversor

Characters
Harry Hart, character in Something for the Boys
Harry Hart, character in Kingsman: The Secret Service

See also
Henry Hart (disambiguation)
Harold Hart (born 1952), American football player
Harold Hart (cricketer) (1889–1953), Australian cricketer
Harry Hart Frank (1908–1964), known by the pen name Pat Frank, American writer, newspaperman, and government consultant